Rick Jones is a fictional character appearing in American comic books published by Marvel Comics. Rick has been a sidekick and friend to The Hulk, Captain America, Mar-Vell / Captain Marvel, Rom the Spaceknight, and Genis-Vell / Captain Marvel.

The character has been an active participant in many significant Marvel Universe story lines including the Kree-Skrull War and the Destiny War. He later acquired powers, causing his learning capabilities to be greatly increased. He decided to direct his new ability towards communications technology, and ended up becoming a hacktivist known as the Whisperer.

Publication history

Rick Jones was created in 1962 by Stan Lee and Jack Kirby and first appeared in Hulk #1 (May 1962).

Fictional character biography
Rick Jones was born in Scarsdale, Arizona. He lost his parents at a young age and grew up in an orphanage. Later, he accepts a dare to drive out to a bomb testing ground in New Mexico. As luck would have it, the gamma bomb designed by Dr. Robert Bruce Banner is being tested. Banner pushes Rick into a protective trench saving his life, but absorbing the gamma rays that transform Banner into the Hulk. Rick thus becomes the sole confidant of the Hulk's true identity.

Early days with the Hulk and the Avengers 
Jones' guilt over causing the incident (and lack of any other place to go) leads him to stay close to Dr. Banner and the Hulk alter ego. In one story, he even gains mental control over Hulk. Eventually, the dangerous unpredictability of Hulk forces Rick to keep his distance.

Later, Rick forms the Teen Brigade, a loose network of teenagers with ham radios throughout the United States. The first Teen Brigade played a role in the origin of the Avengers when the Norse god Loki tampered with the Teen Brigade's radio transmission. Originally, the Teen Brigade intended to bring the Fantastic Four together to battle the Hulk, but instead brought Iron Man, Ant-Man, Wasp, and Thor together to form the Avengers.

After the Hulk's departure from the team, Rick becomes an honorary Avenger. He alerted the team to the Hulk's presence when they began searching for Hulk. He becomes close to the recently revived Captain America although his guilt leads him to leave the Avengers and seek out Banner and Hulk on his own.

Captain America rescues Rick from one of Hulk's rampages, and after that Rick becomes Captain America's sidekick, briefly taking the title and uniform of Bucky, Captain America's long-dead junior partner. This was on Jones' own insistence, over Captain America's guilty objections, noting that others have lost partners and it was time to move on. Rick's brief time as Bucky gave him the training to survive around superheroes to this day.

When Rick believed Hulk to be dead (although Hulk had actually been sent to the future), he revealed the truth of Banner's condition to Col. Glenn Talbot, thus inadvertently making Banner a wanted fugitive by the US Military.

Captain Mar-Vell
After being neglected by Captain America, Rick became fed up with the Captain's ego. After talking with Edwin Jarvis, Rick decided to leave the Avengers for good. Rick joined with the Kree Captain Marvel when he finds himself drawn to the mystical Nega-Bands. Donning the Bands, he is immediately linked to Captain Marvel. Once joined, one of the two remains in a protective bubble in the Negative Zone. After either the person not in the Negative Zone strikes the Nega-Bands together or a certain amount of time passes, the two switch places. Rick and Mar-Vell go on various adventures encountering many different heroes, such as the Hulk, Namor, and Captain America.

Rick and Mar-Vell play a critical part in the Kree-Skrull War. Rick is freed from the Negative Zone through a portal in the Fantastic Four headquarters. Mar-Vell is released from the Negative Zone while Rick is still in the regular world without the use of the Nega-Bands. The bond between the two is broken. At the height of the conflict, the Kree Supreme Intelligence briefly unleashes the Destiny Force from within Rick. Rick uses his new-found ability to summon images of various Golden Age heroes. While at full power, Rick single-handedly stops both the Kree and Skrull fleets long enough to put an end to the conflict. Injuries that Rick sustains lead Mar-Vell to willingly bond with Rick in order to save his life. Shortly after this the Captain Marvel series was re-launched and we found that Rick was not able to contain the energy of Mar-Vell. He was then bombarded with photonic energy, which saved him and enabled him to contain Mar-Vell safely. A consequence of this was that Mar-Vell gained the ability to absorb energy in addition to the nega-band energies to boost his strength and could fly with the photonic energy now.

Rick and Mar-Vell serve as a duo for several years while Rick pursues his musical career and love life. Eventually, the two are again freed from their bond while aiding the Avengers against the Super-Adaptoid. Rick then parts company with Mar-Vell. Rick begins to spend his time with the Hulk again and briefly forms a new Teen Brigade, after which Rick finds himself again teamed with Mar-Vell, though not merged with him as they deal with a legacy left by the Mad Titan Thanos. Sometime after, Mar-Vell dies of cancer that he received when he was exposed to a deadly nerve gas stolen by the villain Nitro. Note: Mar-Vell collapsed from the gas and was comatose until he was given an antidote to the gas. However, despite the antidote, Mar-Vell still developed cancer and there was some momentary concern that the link Rick shared with him could have caused himself to contract the condition. Rick was at Mar-Vell's bedside when he died.

Venturing with Rom
After Mar-Vell's death, Rick began to team with the Hulk again. Guilt over causing Banner to be hit with the gamma rays made Rick decide to expose himself to gamma rays in an attempt to become another Hulk-like being that could stop the Hulk. However this plan backfired and Rick was dying of gamma poisoning until Banner cured him. However, this too led to the consequence of Rick developing a form of blood cancer.

Rick was going to undergo a massive blood transfusion to treat this ailment when the hospital was attacked by monsters created by the Dire Wraiths. Rick was saved by the Spaceknight Rom and began to team with Rom despite the fact that Rick was slowly dying. Upon the final defeat of the Wraiths, Rom banished them all to Limbo and then bade farewell to Rick Jones and Earth. Shortly after Rom left, Rick Jones met the alien called The Beyonder, who cured Jones of his cancer.

Reunion with the Hulk
Shortly after the encounter with the Beyonder, Rick once again teamed with the Hulk. This time, the Hulk had been split into two beings, Banner and Hulk, but the experiment was a failure and both were dying. General Ross tried to stop the process of remerging the two, and Rick intervened only to be dumped into the chemical nutrient bath that was fusing Banner and the Hulk again. This resulted in Rick somehow becoming a Hulk-like creature of his own and he took off into the desert on a savage rampage. Rick would be human by day and be his own green-skinned near mindless Hulk at night.

With the Vision's help, Banner and the Hulk are made whole again, but, both are weak and still dying. As a result of a Nutrient Bath developed by Doc Samson, Banner/Hulk is reverted from Green Hulk into the Grey Hulk. During this time, Rick as Hulk battled the Grey Hulk, Zzzax, the Hulkbusters, and the Outcasts. The Grey Hulk is manipulated by Sam Sterns, along with Banner, into siphoning the radiation from Rick into Sterns. Sterns is then turned back into the Leader, drastically altering his appearance, and Rick is cured of his Hulk transformations.

Rick stays with Banner, the Grey Hulk, Betty Banner, and Clay Quartermain for several months as they travel the country looking for a government supply of gamma bombs. The group splits after the Hulk's apparent death at the Leader's hands. Rick's psionic potential is later released by Moondragon against Atlantean invaders.

Rick authors the book "Sidekick", an autobiography of his time with super-heroes. While on a book tour, he meets Marlo Chandler without realizing that she had only recently broken up with the Hulk (then acting as a Las Vegas thug with the alias Mr. Fixit). Rick is kidnapped by a Skrull vessel and the Hulk aids in Rick's rescue. This starts another period with Rick and the Hulk, this time with Marlo and Betty.

Encounters with death
Rick came in touch with death in several ways during this time with the Hulk. First, Rick dies at the hands of Thanos, along with half of the universe, when Thanos uses the Infinity Gauntlet to impress Death. Rick and the others are brought back in ensuing events. Rick remembers meeting several deceased rock stars.

Rick assisted the Hulk many times during his tenure with the Pantheon. During this time, he guns down an insane killer, but is still wracked with remorse. Over time he bonds with Wolfsbane of X-Factor, who also killed another insane murderer during the same debacle; he even ends up inviting her to his wedding.

Another major encounter with death occurs when Jackie Shorr (who is revealed to be a demented serial killer) comes into his life and claims to be his mother. This claim has not been proven, but she insists that those she killed and left mummified in her basement were substitutes for Rick, and that he is her real son. Shorr is discovered to be insane, but not until after she kills Marlo by stabbing her with a kitchen knife. A horrified Rick refuses Reed Richards's offer to carry out a DNA test, saying that he does not want to know, especially if she is truly his mother.

Rick attempts to bring Marlo back using a resurrection device known as the "deus ex machina" that the Leader developed, but the Hulk, believing that the Leader's efforts are part of a bigger villainous plan, destroys the equipment part way through the process. Marlo is left in a catatonic state. Rick's care eventually helps Marlo return to full health despite the intervention of many other well-meaning friends and family, including Marlo's brothers and Captain America.

Shortly after Marlo is revived, the two become engaged and quickly marry. Neither of them realizes, however, that a portion of Death remains in Marlo. This piece of Death attracted many strange visitors to the wedding, including Mephisto and Death herself.

The married couple soon finds success in a popular talk show, Keeping Up with the Joneses, but it is cut short when Rick is crippled by a Banner-less Hulk, that made a deal to work for Apocalypse and become his Horseman "War" if he would remove the shrapnel from the Hulk's brain. The injury confines Rick to a wheelchair and the debilitation strains his relationship with Marlo. The strain increases with the death of Betty Banner by radiation poisoning to the point that the couple split shortly thereafter.

Rick joins Dr. Banner again after he returns to Earth and merges with the separated Hulk. His serious health problems force him to be brought by the Avengers to the now-captive Supreme Intelligence for aid, which marks the beginning of the Destiny War, as Kang the Conqueror's rejection of his apparent destiny to become Immortus results in Rick's access to the mysterious 'Destiny Force' being used to draw in a team of seven Avengers from different points in time to act as his protectors. Over the course of these events, Rick's injury is healed when he is able to channel the Destiny Force into himself, and after the final battle with the powerful Time Keepers, he is joined with Genis-Vell (the recently endowed Captain Marvel and son of Mar-Vell), due to a temporal paradox involving the future Genis-Vell linking with Rick to save his life.

Captain Marvel (Genis-Vell)
Rick's bond with Genis works in about the same way as his bond with Mar-Vell. The biggest difference is that the two switch in and out of the Microverse rather than the Negative Zone. Genis-Vell's unique birth and accelerated aging makes him the opposite of Rick: full of power but without experience. They compensate for each other's weaknesses with Rick taking on the role of mentor. He helped Genis learn to control his Cosmic Awareness and accept his role as a superhero. As Rick's confidence grew, he also attempted to rekindle his romance with Marlo.

It was not until this point that Marlo's connection with Death is finally revealed. Thanos aids in separating the two, but Rick is prematurely aged and loses an arm in the process. He is later yanked back in time to the Destiny War, where he aids his younger self in the conflict leading to his bond with Genis.

Marlo tries to aid the elderly Rick the way he had helped her when she was catatonic. Rick's pride, however, just causes more problems. The Supreme Intelligence attempts and fails to restore Rick to his normal condition, but he is spontaneously restored to his normal age and health shortly thereafter. Rick believes this was divine aid while Genis believes it was a delayed reaction to the Supreme Intelligence's procedure. No definitive explanation has yet been determined.

For a while, Rick and Genis are yanked back and forth through time. Rick encounters two older versions of himself: one an aging collector surviving under the rule of the Maestro; the other a super-villain named Thanatos. The super-villain Rick was in the process of creating the "ultimate Rick Jones". He is stopped by the elder Rick's ability to wield Thor's hammer, Rick having been judged worthy for things the present Rick had yet to do and things that Thanatos would never achieve.

Rick and Marlo again split when Marlo becomes romantically involved with Moondragon. Shortly after, Genis goes insane when his cosmic awareness reaches its peak. Rick's attempts to continue as Genis' guide are fairly unsuccessful. Genis becomes a callous, homicidal maniac believing himself a god. Rick's friend even destroys the universe just to rebuild it with Rick and Genis as sole survivors.

In the rebuilt reality, Genis again loses his mind. Rick develops an ability to mentally attack Genis through their psychic bond (although the pain is reciprocal). For a time, Genis uses this same link to control Rick. He goes as far as 'convincing' Rick to kill himself on a whim. Genis brings Rick right back to life just as easily.

In part due to Rick's influence, Genis' madness calmed to a point where he was able to maintain a veneer of sanity, albeit with some unpredictability. He creates a recording studio for Rick that allows for fame and fortune at the sake of Internet-based sales of a song written for Marlo. The same song also acts as a catalyst for the two to reunite, with Marlo ending her relationship with Moondragon.

At the end of the series, it is revealed that Rick has a "comic awareness" that the Captain Marvel comic series was coming to an end. He pushed for several of the loose ends of the series to be resolved: Rick and Genis were separated again, and Rick was reunited with Marlo at last report. This ability was primarily created for the needs of this one issue, and it seems unlikely that it will see future usage.

Runaways
Rick was revealed to be the mysterious benefactor of Excelsior. The group is composed of former teenage superheroes dedicated to reforming other super-powered kids from following down the same path. Their first targets are the underage Runaways patrolling Los Angeles in the wake of the supervillain power vacuum since the defeat of the Runaways' evil parents, The Pride, who once controlled the city. Rick tells Excelsior that he wanted the Runaways back in foster care because he did not want them to go through the same experiences he went through.

Fallen Son: Death of Captain America
Rick served as one of the pallbearers at the memorial service for Captain America, along with Ben Grimm, Ms. Marvel, The Falcon, T'Challa and Tony Stark. When Sam Wilson (The Falcon) made his inspirational speech, he mentioned that Rick would know what it's like to have called Captain America a partner. Jones replied by saying "Right on."

World War Hulk
Rick re-connects with the Hulk during the World War Hulk mini-series. He seeks out the Hulk and attempts to talk him down, telling his friend that, while he recognized that the Illuminati had been out of line in their decision to exile him to Sakaar and their apparent involvement with the deaths of thousands of innocent people on that planet, including the Hulk's wife and unborn child, his current blind quest for vengeance was not him, using Hulk's willingness to protect innocent people caught in the fight between him and a Zom-possessed Doctor Strange as proof that the Hulk was still a hero rather than a man blindly seeking vengeance. After the Hulk's climactic battle with the Sentry resulted in him reverting to Bruce Banner, one of the Hulk's associates, Miek (who witnesses and did not prevent the true cause of the deaths on Sakaar which was not the humans), impales Rick through the chest to provoke Bruce into turning back into the Hulk. Rick is seen being loaded into an ambulance.

Becoming A-Bomb

In the aftermath of "World War Hulk", a new Red Hulk emerged, brutally beating and then shooting the Abomination to death. After this occurred, Jones escaped from a secret base in Alaska that had been destroyed in a "Hulk-like" manner. Following this, Red Hulk confronts Jones at Gamma Base, where Bruce Banner is being held. In defense, Jones inexplicably transforms into a creature resembling the Abomination, calling himself A-Bomb. During the fight, the base security measures activate, and giant android harpies (with the face of Betty Ross) attack the two, and attempt to remove them from the base. A-Bomb manages to disable one mid-flight, and they both crash to earth, the robot exploding as it does.

A-Bomb joined with several heroes including the Avengers, the Fantastic Four, She-Hulk and the Hulk to help stop an impending earthquake in San Francisco, which was caused by Red Hulk. After the Red Hulk was defeated, A-Bomb reverted to Rick. He attempted to reveal who Red Hulk really was, but was shot and dragged away by Doc Samson. In The Incredible Hulk vol. 2 #600 it is revealed the reason Doc Samson shot Rick Jones is because he now has multiple personality syndrome. It's also revealed that MODOK was involved in Rick's new condition. After Red Hulk drained the gamma energy from Hulk, A-Bomb had enough intelligence to get Bruce Banner to safety. In The Incredible Hulk vol. 2 #604, A-Bomb was shown to be fully healed, participating along with Korg as Skaar's sparring partner to prepare him for the time when the Hulk will return. In the same issue, Rick was reunited with Marlo, who was transformed by the Leader into Harpy, whom Bruce mistakes for Betty Ross.

It was eventually revealed that Rick was transformed into A-Bomb by the Intelligencia under command of the Leader and MODOK. Using the Abomination's blood they changed him to become their weapon, but soon learned that he could not be controlled as easily as they planned. Instead, they gave him one simple command with a certain trigger—kill Bruce Banner. Suspecting this, Bruce was able to trigger Rick at an earlier time of his choosing and talk him down, thus preventing Rick from being triggered in the future when his plans were to be carried out.

During the Chaos War storyline, A-Bomb and Korg assist the Hulks in fighting Abomination, a Zom-possessed Doctor Strange, and the forces of Amatsu-Mikaboshi. It is later revealed that Rick is able to change between A-Bomb and his normal form.

When a new Hulk persona emerges as the result of an attempt to assassinate Bruce Banner and efforts to save his life using the Extremis virus, this new Hulk, calling himself "Doc Green", decides that gamma-powered superhumans are a threat to humanity that must be eliminated. Deriving a cure for others' gamma mutations from his own physiology, Green seeks out Rick as his first target. Though Rick resists transforming into A-Bomb to defend himself, Green is apparently successful in permanently reverting Rick to human form. Afterward, Rick seeks out Betty (who had been revived from death by Intelligencia and transformed into the Red She-Hulk the same way Rick was transformed into A-Bomb), ostensibly in order to warn her about Doc Green's intentions. When Green arrives and Betty assaults him as the Red She-Hulk, she finds herself reverting to normal involuntarily and realizes that Rick had dosed her with Green's cure during a meal they had shared earlier. Rick admits to anxieties over the possibility of losing control of his transformation, and an addiction to the "rush" of being A-Bomb. However, he was unwilling to aid Doc Green in curing Betty until Doc Green informed him that Betty, acting under orders from a watchdog group called The Order of the Shield, was behind the attempt on Banner's life. Rick is left behind with the equally powerless Betty as Doc Green continues on his mission.

Working as Whisperer
As a side effect of losing his Hulk abilities, Rick briefly gains the ability to learn any task at lightning speed. He uses this ability to become a master hacktivist known as the Whisperer during the "Avengers: Standoff!" storyline and secretly aids the new Captain America. He uncovers a plot by Maria Hill called Project Kobik, which uses shattered Cosmic Cube remains to create a new cube. Phil Coulson's group learns about Pleasant Hill and Rick's involvement. Deathlok, Daisy Johnson, and Jemma Simmons investigated Rick' house and discovered a hidden escape route. They follow Rick through the Morlock Tunnels and apprehend him. During an interrogation at the S.H.I.E.L.D. Battlecarrier, the New Avengers arrived to retrieve Jones from S.H.I.E.L.D. It turns out that the New Avengers were contacted by Rick through a pre-recorded video that was to be sent to them in the event that the alien nanobots he ingested noticed him being unconscious. The New Avengers invading the S.H.I.E.L.D. Battlecarrier to retrieve Jones prompts The Pentagon into retaliating by unleashing a monster called the American Kaiju on the New Avengers. In the aftermath of the events that transpired at Pleasant Hill, Steve Rogers offers Rick the chance to join S.H.I.E.L.D. as part of his reparations for his hacktivism.

During the "Secret Empire" storyline, a hacker named Rashaun Lucas is entrusted with key data by Rick Jones that Jones says will prove the truth about Captain America, who at the time was reprogrammed by Red Skull's clone using the powers of Kobik into being a Hydra sleeper agent. Captain America later sentences a captive Rick Jones to death by firing squad.

Revival as Subject B
After his death, Rick Jones was buried at Severin Memorial Cemetery. The Immortal Hulk takes Doc Samson there in order to prove that he, Bruce Banner, Betty Ross, and Rick Jones are all connected to one constant theme: resurrection. They find Rick Jones' grave dug up and his body missing. In the U.S. Hulk Operations' Shadow Base Site B, Rick Jones' corpse is used for gamma experiments by scientists led by Charlene McGowan and his whole body is covered in gamma energy, which resurrects him as an Abomination/A-Bomb-like creature with two faces and many finger-like structures surrounding his face called "Subject B". Using a camera placed inside Rick's head, the U.S. Hulk Operations dispatched Subject B to Reno, Nevada to draw out Hulk. After Subject B killed two bystanders, Hulk appeared to fight it thinking that it was a form of Abomination. He discovered that it was actually Rick as his two faces spoke short and tortured sentences. Hulk had no other choice but to fight Rick's Subject B form. During the fight, Subject B shot acid at Hulk that dissolved part of his flesh and negated his ability to heal. Upon melting Hulk's limbs, Betty Ross' Harpy form appeared and ripped open Hulk in order to consume his heart. This caused Rick Jones' Subject B to attack Betty Ross' Harpy. Hulk revives enough to regenerate his limbs and punch Subject B. Harpy then continues her attack on Subject B and rips at his stomach to prevent him from emitting acid. During the fight between Subject B and Harpy, Hulk got Jackie McGee to safety as two War-Wagons sent by Reginald Fortean arrive. When in the air, Harpy dropped Subject B onto one of the War-Wagons. After destroying the War-Wagons, Hulk ripped open Subject B's body to discover that it was a shell containing an emaciated Rick in his human form. With Rick in tow, Hulk, Harpy, and Jackie fled the area upon Hulk seeing Gamma Flight approaching. Some days later, Rick was still emaciated and speaking broken words until a burst of energy awakens and restores him. Using what he had learned while being experimented on, Rick directed Hulk, Harpy, and Jackie McGee toward the U.S. Hulk Operations' base at Groom Lake in Area 51. When Doc Samson and Gamma Flight confronted General Fortean at the U.S. Hulk Operations' base, Hulk, Rick, Harpy, and Jackie also show up as both sides see that General Fortean has merged with the Subject B body. While Hulk and Gamma Flight fight General Fortean and the U.S. Hulk Operations' soldiers, Rick assisted Harpy and Jackie McGee where they found the gamma mutate Delbert Frye in a room with scientist and Charlene McGowan who tearfully accepted responsibility for what happened to Rick and Delbert. This caused Rick to spare her life.

Soon after, however, it is revealed that Rick's body is in fact a puppet controlled by The Leader. During Hulk's photo op following the repairs of Georgeville, Iowa which was wrecked during Hulk's fight with the Avengers, Leader controlled Rick Jones into overflowing Hulk with gamma energy to kill him which caused an explosion. Rick protected the people from the explosion, but was mutated into an elongated form with extra arms and legs in the process. Using Rick, Leader watched Hulk's fight with Gamma Flight. When Titania noticed that Rick made an unintelligent comment, Leader controlled Rick into knocking her down causing Absorbing Man to fight Hulk some more. Then Leader allows Rick to be teleported to Shadow Base just as he planned.

Powers and abilities
Rick Jones is an athletic man who previously had no powers. He received special training in combat and gymnastics by Captain America, making him a highly skilled martial artist. Rick is also a self-taught folk/rock 'n' roll singer, guitarist, and harmonica player.

One time, Rick wielded the Destiny Force: a powerful ability utilized during a Kree-Skrull War storyline. Focusing this power allowed him to perform amazing feats, such as pulling various members of the Avengers from past, present and future. Although, its generally random unless another controlling influence, Libra is assisting him.

Rick's latent psionic potential had been once unleashed by the Kree Supreme Intelligence, but he is unable to utilize it at will. He was also able to shift dimensional positions with Mar-Vell, and later Genis-Vell for a time.

After he was held captive by the Intelligencia and subjected extreme experiments on him, Rick gains the ability to transform into a blue-skinned creature resembling the Abomination with immense physical attributes (even the Red Hulk only causes superficial damage), but stunting his speech patterns similar to the classic Hulk persona. His scales can change color to blend in these surroundings. Following experimentation by MODOK, Rick's human persona became dominant after the price of trapping him in A-Bomb form. Bruce speculates in this second storyline that is actually a deliberate, albeit subconscious, action on Rick's part stemming from his fear of allowing others to get hurt, because he might do more harm than good. The Hulk's encouragement let him to remain as A-Bomb so he would always be ready for more heroics. Thanks to the Hulk, Rick now transforms himself at will while maintaining his full intelligence and personality. Unfortunately, he lost these A-Bomb powers when the Hulk, under a new persona called "Doc Green," decided to eliminate almost all gamma-mutated people. He injected A-Bomb with the dose of his cure, which made Rick completely human once more.

The consequence of these side effects from his A-Bomb form have affected Rick's brain. According to himself, he can now pick up natural skills lightning-fast. His mind was like a sponge and Rick directed it through communications, thus becoming an expert in security hacking.

As Subject B, Rick has superhuman strength, enhanced durability, regeneration, fingernail claws, and toxikinesis. This highly corrosive poison from his hands or two mouths could dissolve flesh and negate healing factors. The amount of acid depends on how much he consumes.

When he got separated from Subject B's body, Rick obtained new powers - gamma manipulation and levitation.

Reception

Accolades 

 In 2015, Entertainment Weekly ranked Rick Jones 18th in their "Let's rank every Avenger ever" list.
 In 2021, CBR.com ranked Rick Jones 1st in their "10 Strongest Marvel Sidekicks" list.
 In 2021, CBR.com ranked Rick Jones 8th in their "10 Smartest Marvel Sidekicks" list.
 In 2022, Collider included Rick Jones in their "10 Strongest Superhero Sidekicks in Marvel Comics" list.
 In 2022, Newsarama ranked Rick Jones 8th in their "Best superhero sidekicks of all time" list.

Other versions

Marvel 2099
In the series Spider-Man 2099, Thanatos first appears in 2099 chasing a confused, amnesiac man known as the Net Prophet. He is later revealed to be an alternate Rick Jones who had stayed with the Supreme Intelligence after the Kree-Skrull War. Thanatos wants to merge various Ricks into an "Ultimate Rick Jones". He is defeated by the Rick Jones of the present and the Rick of the Future Imperfect timeline.

The Incredible Hulk: Future Imperfect
In the dystopian alternate future seen in the miniseries The Incredible Hulk: Future Imperfect, in which the Hulk has become the insane megalomaniac known as the Maestro after two nuclear wars, the elderly Rick Jones is the near-senile and crippled leader of the last bastion of resistance against the Maestro. He lives in a museum of artifacts that had belonged to various deceased superhumans. He uses a time machine to send his followers back in time to recruit the Hulk in order to defeat the Maestro. During the ensuing conflict, Rick is killed, and before the Hulk returns to his own time period, he spreads Rick's ashes over Captain America's shield before throwing it into space.

House of M
In the House of M storyline, Private Genis-Vell stumbles upon a tombstone that stated that Rick Jones died at a young age from some unknown tragic accident.

The Last Avengers Story
In the future time period seen in The Last Avengers Story, Rick Jones has created a super-hero vault to hold important artifacts and information. It is raided by Ultron in a bid to kill the Avengers.

Ultimate Marvel
A young Rick Jones is introduced in Ultimate Marvel during Ultimate Origins, where the Ultimate Watchers announce to the Fantastic Four that they "will now pick a herald to help you with your new world order." They choose young Rick, who develops superpowers in his backyard in Queens.

Six months after Ultimatum, Rick wakes up in a hospital from a coma induced by the surge of energy given to him by the Watchers. Rick's mother thinks her son is a mutant and confides in her neighbor, May Parker. May tells Peter, Bobby, and Johnny to "suit up" and go talk to Rick. When they confront Rick, he is startled and accidentally uses his newfound powers to teleport himself and Spider-Man to a restaurant in Ann Arbor, Michigan. Even more scared, Rick says he wants to go home, at which point he teleports them back to New York. When Bobby tells Rick it is okay to be a mutant, Rick exclaims that he is not a mutant and that he was given his powers by a "floating eye". Johnny recalls over a half a year prior when he and the former Fantastic Four were investigating the appearance of the Watchers. He tells Rick that he must be the herald the Watchers had chosen.

Learning this, Rick is too upset and reluctant to accept the Watchers' mysterious role and wants to travel to Project Pegasus to demand the Watcher Uatu, who was previously kept there, remove his powers. Despite Johnny Storm's protest, Rick teleports everyone to Project Pegasus and discovers it is being attacked by the Serpent Squad. Rick and his allies fight the Serpent Squad, and Rick successfully controls his powers and defeats the Squad. Returning to New York, Rick realizes that he actually enjoys having superpowers and chooses to take the superhero alias Nova. Rick decides to go on a self-discovery journey to understand what his role is for the world. He would return to duty following the death of Spider-Man.

During Cataclysm/Hunger, a returning Nova teleports to Hala, the next planet the merged Galactus being is attacking. Captain Mahr Vell is fatally wounded by Galactus, and with his last breath tells Rick to use his armor to activate a powerful weapon to finally destroy Galactus. Rick wears the suit and becomes the new Captain Marvel. With his augmented powers, Rick defends the Kree arks. Captain Marvel transports himself and Galactus away and activates the armor's weapon, which should kill the cosmic entity. During the attack, Rick blows a "hole between universes" and appears outside Earth-1610. The Watcher accompanies Captain Marvel and tells him that while the attack did not kill Galactus, who is now heading Earth, it is no longer his problem, and that he will soon see a new threat. He returns with the Future Foundation when they are accidentally teleported to this space between universes. After Iron Man deduces Rick's teleportation abilities are only limited by the locations he can visualize, Rick visualizes Earth, which is enough for them to safely teleport back to their home

In other media

Television

 Rick Jones appears in The Marvel Super Heroes, voiced by Paul Soles.
 Rick Jones appears in The Incredible Hulk (1982), voiced by Michael Horton. This version is blonde, wears a cowboy hat, and has a girlfriend named Rita.
 Rick Jones appears in the Fantastic Four episode "Nightmare in Green", voiced by Benny Grant..
 Rick Jones appears in The Incredible Hulk (1996), voiced by Luke Perry. Most notably, in the three-part episode "Darkness and Light", he falls into a radiation-saturated nutrient bath while it was being used to fuse the Hulk and Bruce Banner back together after it was used to separate them. While he was in the bath, Rick soaks up gamma radiation and becomes a teenage Hulk. He is later cured after the Leader absorbs his power to restore his own.
 Rick Jones appears in the Iron Man: Armored Adventures episode "Uncontrollable", voiced by Andrew Francis.
 Rick Jones / A-Bomb appears in Hulk and the Agents of S.M.A.S.H., voiced by Seth Green. In the two-part series premiere, "Doorway to Destruction", Rick develops levitating cameras to film the Hulk's heroic exploits in the style of a reality TV show. After he is exposed to gamma energy during the Hulk's fight with Annihilus, Rick is physically mutated into A-Bomb, but retains his mind. After joining forces with the Hulk, She-Hulk, Red Hulk, and Skaar, Rick christens them the "Agents of S.M.A.S.H."
 Rick Jones / A-Bomb appears in the Ultimate Spider-Man four-part episode "Contest of Champions", voiced again by Seth Green.
 Additionally, the episode "Return to the Spider-Verse" Pt. 3 features a Marvel Noir-inspired incarnation of Rick Jones (also voiced by Green), who serves as a member of Joe Fixit's gang and calls himself A-Bombardier.

Film
 Rick Jones was originally intended to appear in Hulk (2003), but was replaced by Harper (portrayed by Kevin Rankin), Bruce Banner's colleague.
 Rick Jones was originally planned to appear in The Incredible Hulk (2008), but was written out by Edward Norton. Despite this, Jones is briefly mentioned during the opening credits.

Video games
 Rick Jones appears in The Incredible Hulk film tie-in game, voiced by Jon Curry. This version serves as an ally of the Hulk after the latter saved him from the Enclave and works with him to stop them.
 Rick Jones / A-Bomb appears as an NPC in Marvel: Ultimate Alliance 2, with vocal effects provided by Fred Tatasciore.
 Rick Jones / A-Bomb appears as a playable DLC character in Lego Marvel Super Heroes, voiced by Will Friedle and Steve Blum respectively.
 Rick Jones / A-Bomb appears as a playable character in Marvel: Avengers Alliance.
 Rick Jones / A-Bomb appears as a playable character in Lego Marvel's Avengers, voiced by Robbie Daymond.
 Rick Jones / A-Bomb appears as a playable character in Lego Marvel Super Heroes 2.

References

External links
 Rick Jones at Marvel.com

Characters created by Jack Kirby
Characters created by Stan Lee
Comics characters introduced in 1962
Fictional characters from Arizona
Fictional characters with dissociative identity disorder
Fictional characters with nuclear or radiation abilities
Fictional characters with superhuman durability or invulnerability
Fictional hackers
Fictional musicians
Hulk (comics)
Marvel Comics characters who are shapeshifters
Marvel Comics characters who can move at superhuman speeds
Marvel Comics characters with accelerated healing
Marvel Comics characters with superhuman strength
Marvel Comics male characters
Marvel Comics male superheroes
Marvel Comics mutates
Marvel Comics orphans
Marvel Comics sidekicks
Marvel Comics superheroes
Teenage superheroes